Wenquan is a town of Conghua in central Guangdong province, China, located about  northeast of Guangzhou Baiyun International Airport. , it has 3 residential communities and 22 villages under its administration.

See also 
List of township-level divisions of Guangdong

References

External links 

Township-level divisions of Guangdong